Pelyaginets is a rural locality (a village) in Kichmegnskoye Rural Settlement, Kichmengsko-Gorodetsky District, Vologda Oblast, Russia. The population was 14 as of 2002.

Geography 
Pelyaginets is located 43 km southwest of Kichmengsky Gorodok (the district's administrative centre) by road. Kudrino is the nearest rural locality.

References 

Rural localities in Kichmengsko-Gorodetsky District